Agnieszka Radwańska was the defending champion, but lost in the quarterfinals to Simona Halep.

Belinda Bencic won her first WTA title after Halep retired in the final with scoreline at 7–6(7–5), 6–7(4–7), 3–0. Bencic defeated six Grand Slam finalists in succession on her way to the title.

At 18 years and 23 weeks of age, Bencic became the youngest female player to win the tournament, eclipsing Ana Ivanovic who won the title in 2006 aged 18 years and 41 weeks.

Seeds
The top eight seeds received a bye into the second round.

Draw

Finals

Top half

Section 1

Section 2

Bottom half

Section 3

Section 4

Qualifying

Seeds

Qualifiers

Lucky losers
  Julia Görges

Qualifying draw

First qualifier

Second qualifier

Third qualifier

Fourth qualifier

Fifth qualifier

Sixth qualifier

Seventh qualifier

Eighth qualifier

Ninth qualifier

Tenth qualifier

Eleventh qualifier

Twelfth qualifier

References

Main Draw
Qualifying Draw

Women's Singles